The men's downhill of the 2006 Winter Olympics was held at Sestriere, Italy, on Sunday, 12 February.

The men's downhill competition is the marquee outdoor event of the Winter Olympics, and is the first alpine event on the schedule.  It consists of a single high-speed run down a challenging slope, with a vertical drop exceeding .

The defending Olympic champion was Fritz Strobl of Austria, the reigning world champion was Bode Miller of the United States; Austrian Michael Walchhofer was the defending World Cup downhill champion and led the current season entering the Olympics, ahead of Strobl and American Daron Rahlves.

The thirtieth racer on the course, Antoine Dénériaz of France won the gold medal, Walchhofer took the silver, and the bronze medalist was Bruno Kernen of Switzerland; Miller was fifth, Strobl eighth, and Rahlves tenth. Dénériaz's surprise win was by a margin of 0.72 seconds, the largest in this event in 42 years. He had entered the Olympics tied for tenth in the World Cup downhill standings; his best finish was seventh at Val Gardena in mid-December.

Results
The race was started at 12:00 local time, (UTC +1).

References

External links
Official Olympic Report
FIS results

Downhill